Morrow County is the name of two counties in the United States:

 Morrow County, Ohio 
 Morrow County, Oregon